Michael Preece (born September 15, 1936) is an American film and television director, script supervisor, producer, and actor best known for directing television series Dallas and Walker, Texas Ranger and films The Prize Fighter and Logan's War: Bound by Honor.

Early life 
Preece was born in Los Angeles, California and graduated from Alexander Hamilton High School. His father was a salesman for a cigarette and cigar company, and his mother, Thelma Preece, was the first female business agent in Hollywood and founder of the Script Clerks Guild which later became the Script Supervisor Local 871 IATSE.

Career 
While a freshman student at Santa Monica City College in the summer of 1955 in the early days of television Preece took on a job as a script supervisor. He worked as a script supervisor on such TV series as Mr. Novak, I Spy, and Hawaii Five-O and a score of such feature films as The Great Locomotive Chase (1956), The Spirit of St. Louis (1957), The Old Man and the Sea (1958), Cimarron (1962), Mutiny on the Bounty (1962), How the West Was Won (1965), Morituri (1965), Will Penny (1968), True Grit (1969), The Hawaiians (1970), The Getaway (1972), The Paper Chase (1973), and Breakheart Pass (1975). Starting in 1975 Preece directed over 300 episodes of TV series, including Dallas where he set a record for most episodes directed and filmed each cast member firing a gun in order to ensure that no one knew who shot J.R. He also directed episodes of Walker, Texas Ranger, The Streets of San Francisco, Knots Landing, 7th Heaven, Falcon Crest, Barnaby Jones, The Bionic Woman, T.J. Hooker, MacGyver, When the Whistle Blows (TV series), Baywatch, Hunter, Fantasy Island, The Incredible Hulk, Trapper John, M.D., Stingray (NBC TV series), B. J. and the Bear,  Ace Crawford, Private Eye, Mike Hammer (1984 TV Series),  Jake and the Fatman, The Young Riders, Flamingo Road and Renegade.

Preece also directed such films as The Prize Fighter (1979) one of the most financially successful films ever released by New World Pictures, Great Day (1983), Beretta's Island (1994),  Walker Texas Ranger 3: Deadly Reunion (1994), Logan's War: Bound by Honor (1998) (for which he won a Lone Star Film & Television Award for Best TV Director), Dallas: War of the Ewings (1998), and The President's Man (2000).

Personal life
Preece currently resides in Los Angeles, California. In 1969 he married Evelyn Thomas (February 2, 1942 - March 26, 2017). He had four children from a previous marriage. His daughter Gretchen is married to singer-songwriter Randy Newman.

Preece has spoken at Women in Film breakfast meetings.

References

External links
 

Living people
1936 births
Film directors from Los Angeles
American television directors